Graham Joseph Ramshaw (7 August 1945 – 15 September 2006) was a leading Australian rules footballer, playing for Perth Football Club in the Western Australian Football League (WAFL), Fitzroy Football Club in the Victorian Football League (VFL) and Central District in the South Australian National Football League (SANFL).

Early years
Born in North Fremantle, Western Australia to a long-serving Perth committee member, Ramshaw was a student at Manning Primary School and Applecross High School, and was a star junior footballer, being awarded the best player of the national State schoolboys' football carnival in Brisbane in 1959.

Career
Ramshaw made his senior debut for Perth aged 17 in 1963 as a full forward and impressed to the extent that VFL club Fitzroy sought to recruit him for the 1964 VFL season. Perth were reluctant to clear him but, after threats from Ramshaw to step down from football, cleared him to Fitzroy just prior to the 30 June clearance deadline and Ramshaw played six games and kicked four goals for Fitzroy before returning to Perth for the 1965 season. 

Ramshaw was a premiership player with Perth in 1966, 1967 and 1968, the first as a full forward while the latter two as a full back. Ramshaw was awarded life membership of Perth in 1972 and finished with 178 games for Perth.

In 1974 Ramshaw transferred to SANFL club Central District, where he spent two injury riddled years, playing just three games for no goals. Following his retirement from football, Ramshaw returned to Western Australia and worked in the concrete and waste management industries.

Death
Ramshaw died from cancer in North Beach, Western Australia, aged 61. He was survived by his wife Kaye, three sons and seven grandchildren. One son, Darrin Ramshaw, played cricket for Western Australia and Victoria and football for Perth, while another, Troy, played three games for Perth.

References 

1945 births
2006 deaths
Australian rules footballers from Fremantle
Central District Football Club players
Fitzroy Football Club players
Perth Football Club players
Cricketers from Fremantle
People educated at Applecross Senior High School